Mark X. Laskowski (born March 15, 1968 in Parma, Ohio) is an American voice actor. He is known for many roles in anime dubs for ADV Films and Seraphim Digital/Sentai Filmworks, such as Shinpachi Shimura from Gintama the Movie, Kobungo Inuta from Hakkenden,  K from Puni Puni Poemi, Flint from the Bodacious Space Pirates movie, and Tweedledim from the Mardock Scramble movies.

English dubbing roles
Air Gear - Issa "Buccha" Mihotoke
Akame ga Kill! - Kaku (Ep. 11), Pimp (Ep. 6)
AKB0048 - Yuka's Father, Additional Voices
Angel Beats! - Igarashi (Ep. 9), Mysterious Youth (Ep. 12)
Angelic Layer - Masaharu Ogata
Area 88 - Bucksy (ADV dub)
The Book of Bantorra - Relia Bookwat
Btooom! - Mitsuo Akechi
Campione! - Toma Amakasu
Clannad After Story - Tajima, Additional Voices
Coicent - Yellow Brother
Comic Party Revolution - Yosshi
Cyber Team in Akihabara - Mr. Takaido (Ep. 8)
Diamond Daydreams - Jurouta Toubiki
Devil Survivor 2: The Animation - Yuzuru Akie
Dirty Pair OVA - Li
Excel Saga - Norikuni Iwata
From the New World - Subaru
Ghost Hound - Eiichi Ooya, Hiroshi Furusawa
Gintama: The Movie - Shinpachi Shimura
Godannar - Morimoto
The Guin Saga - Duke Bek, Vlon
Guyver: The Bio-Boosted Armor - Elegen 
Haikyu!! - Akira Kunimi, Isamu Nakashima 
Hakkenden: Eight Dogs of the East - Kobungo Inuta
Hakuōki - Kodo Yukimura, Misawa
Halo Legends - Teenage Boy (Homecoming), Marine (The Babysitter)
Highschool of the Dead - Kohta Hirano
Horizon in the Middle of Nowhere II - Felipe Segundo, Kobold, Milton, Pedro Valdes
Intrigue in the Bakumatsu - Irohanihoheto - Kaen Ryu (Ep. 5-6), Tesshu Yamaoka, Tsuginosuke Kawai
Inu x Boku SS - Yujiro Kouda
Kiba - Stonos, Xeed, Additional Voices
Kurau Phantom Memory - Mike (Ep. 1)
Legends of the Dark King - Juza, Hucker
Majestic Prince - Degawa, Shinzaburo, Shirato
Majikoi! - Oh! Samurai Girls - Maro Ayanokoji, Yamato's Father (Ep. 13), Dog (Ep. 2)
Mardock Scramble: The Second Combustion - Tweedledum
Martian Successor Nadesico - Jun Aoi
Mazinkaiser - Boss
Nerima Daikon Brothers - Korean Boss
Night Raid 1931 - Senzo Kakinuma (Ep. 0), Seishiro Itagaki (Ep. 7), Additional Voices
Noir - Rizzo
Papuwa - Nagoya Willow, Great Man-God, Blue Scat Mouse
Parasyte - Mamoru Uda
Problem Children are Coming from Another World, aren't they? - Male Calico Cat
Pumpkin Scissors - Paulo
RahXephon - Souichi Yagumo
Science Ninja Team Gatchaman - Mukashiski (Ep. 38), Additional Voices (ADV Dub)
Shirobako - Seiichi Kinoshita
Sister Princess - Minai
The Ambition of Oda Nobuna - Konoe Sakihisa
The Super Dimension Fortress Macross - Warera Nantes
The World God Only Knows - Dokurou Skull (Season 3, OVAs)
Tsuritama - Duck Leader
UFO Ultramaiden Valkyrie - Fukami
Xam'd Lost Memories - Junichiro Nishimura, Minagawa

References

External links

Mark Laskowski at CrystalAcids Anime Voice Actor Database

Living people
People from Parma, Ohio
American male voice actors
Male actors from Ohio
1968 births